Bathgate Thistle Football Club are a Scottish football club, based in the town of Bathgate, West Lothian.

Nicknamed Thistle, they were formed in 1937 and presently play their home games at Creamery Park, which has room for 3,000 spectators. Their home shirts are blue with a white trim and their away shirts are black with a white trim.

In 2006, Thistle reached the final of the Scottish Junior Cup, losing 2–1 to Auchinleck Talbot at Rugby Park, Kilmarnock, in front of around 7,000 spectators. In 2008, the club reached the final again, this time defeating Cumnock Juniors 2–1.

Thistle have a community football club involving some of the town's youth sides under Bathgate Juniors and are the pathway to senior adult football in the town of Bathgate.The Senior side is managed by Gordon Wilson.The U20's started in 22/23 and play in the Scottish Lowland Development League.

Coaching staff 

Source

Current squad
As of January 2023

Managerial history

c Caretaker manager

Honours

Scottish Junior Cup 
 Winners: 2007–08
 Runners-up: 2005–06

Other Honours

East Region Division Two champions: 1986–87, 1990–91
East of Scotland Junior Cup winners: 1941–42, 2006–07
St. Michael Cup winners: 1940–41, 1959–60, 2000–01
Brown Cup winners: 1941–42
Thornton Shield winners: 1943–44, 1944–45
RL Rae Cup winners: 1965–66 – Manager was William Ross Smith (ex-Partick Thistle, Queen of the South and Berwick Rangers)
Fife and Lothians Cup winners: 2009–10

References

External links
 Official website
 
 

 
Football in West Lothian
Football clubs in Scotland
Scottish Junior Football Association clubs
Association football clubs established in 1937
1937 establishments in Scotland
East of Scotland Football League teams